Ucha Malakievich Japaridze (– 6 July 1988) was a Soviet and Georgian painter.

He was born in Gari, a small village in the Racha region of Georgia,  which was then part of the Russian Empire.

As a painter, Japaridze was one of the most important figures in the development of 20th-century Georgian visual arts. He enjoyed creating detailed portraits and is responsible for producing a series of portraits of prominent persons such as his 1949 pencil and pastel sketch of Vano Sarajishvili, currently held at the Art Palace of Georgia - Museum of Cultural History in Tbilisi, Georgia.

Japaridze was given a number of awards during his life, including Public Artist of Georgian SSR (1946), Honored Artist of Georgia (1943), Academician of the Georgian Academy of Arts (1958), Laureate of the Shota Rustaveli Prize (1987), and Honored Citizen of Tbilisi (1982).

He was a chancellor of the Tbilisi State Academy of Arts from 1942 to 1948.

He died in Tbilisi in 1988. His former home in Tbilisi was turned into a museum in the same year.

External links 
 Museum website

1906 births
1988 deaths
20th-century educators
20th-century painters from Georgia (country)
Communist Party of the Soviet Union members
Full Members of the USSR Academy of Arts
Tbilisi State Academy of Arts alumni
Academic staff of the Tbilisi State Academy of Arts
People's Artists of the USSR (visual arts)
Stalin Prize winners
Recipients of the Order of Lenin
Recipients of the Order of the Red Banner of Labour
Rustaveli Prize winners
Educators from Georgia (country)
Soviet educators
Soviet painters
Soviet printmakers
Honored Art Workers of the Azerbaijan SSR